Robert Lowery (born 22 May 1937) is a British sprint canoer who competed in the early to mid-1960s. Competing two Summer Olympics, he was eliminated in the semifinals of both events at both games (1960: K-1 4 × 500 m, 1964: K-4 1000 m).

References
Sports-reference.com profile

1937 births
Canoeists at the 1960 Summer Olympics
Canoeists at the 1964 Summer Olympics
Living people
Olympic canoeists of Great Britain
British male canoeists